Providas Romanorum was an Apostolic constitution promulgated by Pope Benedict XIV on March 18, 1751. The  constitution condemned Freemasonry on the grounds of its alleged naturalism, demand for oaths, secrecy, religious indifferentism, and possible threat to the church and state.  It confirmed the previous constitution In eminenti apostolatus. It specifically forbids Roman Catholics from seeking membership in any Masonic group.

See also  
 Papal Documents relating to Freemasonry
 Anti-Masonry
 Christianity and Freemasonry
 Catholicism and Freemasonry
 Clarification concerning status of Catholics becoming Freemasons

References

External links
Providas Romanorum

Catholicism and Freemasonry
Documents of Pope Benedict XIV
1751 in Europe
1751 works

18th-century Christian texts